Central Plain or Central Plains may refer to:

Regions 

 Zhongyuan, a plain in Northern China in the lower reaches of the Yellow River which was the cradle of Chinese civilisation
 Central Plains Economic Zone
 Central Plain (Wisconsin), one of the geographical regions of Wisconsin
 Central Plains Region, an informal geographic region of the Canadian province of Manitoba
 Central Plains Water, an enhancement scheme for the "Central Plains" of Canterbury, New Zealand
 The South Central Plains taking up most of Piney Woods, a forest terrestrial ecoregion in the Southern United States.
 Central Thailand, a plain in Thailand
 Great Plains, in North America, a portion of which is known as Central Plain
 Central Plains USD 112, a unified school district including various communities in central Kansas, USA